|-style="background:#E9E9E9;"
! colspan="2" style="text-align:left;" |Parties
!Votes
!%
!+/-
!Seats
!+/-
|-
| style="background-color: " |
| style="text-align:left;" | Christian Democratic Union
| 605,265	
| 48.0%
| +3.6%
| 65
| +2
|-
| width=5px style="background-color: " |
| style="text-align:left;" | Social Democratic Party of Germany
| 483,778
| 38.3%
| -4.4%
| 51
| -10
|-
| style="background-color: " |
| style="text-align:left;" | Alternative List
| 90,653
| 7.2%
| +3.5%
| 9
| +9
|-
| style="background-color: " |
| style="text-align:left;" | Free Democratic Party
| 70,529	
| 5.6%
| -2.5%
| 7
| -4
|-
| style="background-color: " |
| style="text-align:left;" | Socialist Unity Party of West Berlin
| 8,176
| 0.6%
| -0.5%
| 0
| 
|-
| style="background-color: " |
| style="text-align:left;" | Green List Berlin
| 3,765
| 0.3%
| +0.3%
| 0
| 
|- style="background:#E9E9E9;"
! colspan="2" style="text-align:left;" |Total
! style="text-align:center;" | 1,291,842	
! style="text-align:center;" colspan="2"| 100%
! style="text-align:center;" | 132
! style="text-align:center;" | -3
|-
|colspan=7|Source 
|}

State election, 1981
1981 elections in Germany